This is a list of known American football players who have played for the Buffalo Bisons (NFL) of the National Football League in 1924 - 1925 as well as the 1927 and 1929 season. It includes players that have played at least one match with the team.



A
Jim Ailinger,
Neely Allison,
Les Asplundh

B
Charlie Barbour,
Herb Bizer,
Karl Bohren,
Benny Boynton,
Russ Burt, 
Doc Bruder,
Walt Brewster

C
Pete Calac, 
Glen Carberry, 
Ed Carman,
Harlan Carr,
Floyd Christman,
Harry Collins, 
Ed Comstock,
Ulysses Courmier,
Frank Culver, 
Harry Curzon

D
Don Dimmick,
Art Dorfman,
Bud Doyle

F
Lou Feist, 
Darrell Fisher,
Eddie Fisher,
Jack Flavin,
Wally Foster

G
Chet Gay,
Frank Glassman,
Gil Gregory,
Chuck Guarnieri,
Milo Gwosden

H
Swede Hagberg,
Russ Hathaway,
Ken Hauser,
Norm Harvey,
Ben Hobson,
Iolas Huffman, 
Tommy Hughitt

I
Barlow Irvin

J
Al Jolley,
Ken Jones

K
Eddie Kaw, 
Jim Kendrick
Jimmy Kennedy,
Glenn Knack,
Babe Kraus,
Walt Koppisch

M
Bob Mahan,
Jack McArthur, 
Frank McConnell,
Nat McCombs,
Elmer McCormick,
Paul Minick,
Al Mitchell,
Jesus Montero, 
Frank Morrissey,
Henry Myles

N
Jim Noble

O
Lowell Otte

P
Art Peed, 
Earl Plank

R
Bob Rapp,
Max Reed,
Ben Roderick,
Jess Rodriguez,
Stan Rosen,
Spin Roy,
Cassy Ryan

S
Red Shurtliffe,
George Snell

T
Lloyd Thompson,
Mike Trainor

U
Jack Underwood

V
Chase Van Dyne,
Charlie Van Horn, 
Norton Vedder,
Tillie Voss

W
Bullets Walson,
Len Watters,
Chuck Weimer,
Ralph White,
Jim Woodruff

Y
Swede Youngstrom,

References
Buffalo Bisons (NFL) roster

Lists
 
Buffalo Bis